Saint-Amant-de-Montmoreau (literally Saint-Amant of Montmoreau; before 2013: Saint-Amant) is a former commune in the Charente department in southwestern France. On 1 January 2017, it was merged into the new commune Montmoreau.

Population

See also
Communes of the Charente department

References

Former communes of Charente
Charente communes articles needing translation from French Wikipedia